Postcard from Summerisle is the first album by the English musical duo Patrick & Eugene.

Track listing

Personnel
Patrick Dawes - vocals, percussion, sound effects
Eugene Bezodis - vocals, saxophone, clarinet, flute

Additional personnel
Simon Eames - bass, banjo, melodica, trombone
Richard Lamy - banjo (4, 11)
Clive Jenner - drums
Matt Kloss - double bass
 Keeling Lee - guitar (2)
 Nils Johnson - handclapping (12)

References

External links
Official website

2004 debut albums